Radical 204 meaning "embroidery" or "needlework" is 1 of 4 Kangxi radicals (214 radicals total) composed of 12 strokes.

In the Kangxi Dictionary there are only eight characters (out of 49,030) to be found under this radical.

Characters with Radical 204

Literature

External links
Unihan Database - U+9EF9

204
Embroidery